Russian Orthodox Church in Great Britain and Ireland may refer to:

 Russian Orthodox Diocese of Sourozh
 Russian Orthodox Diocese of Great Britain and Western Europe